Trops is a Philippine television drama romance comedy series, broadcast by GMA Network. Directed by Linnet Zurbano, it stars Kenneth Medrano, Miggy Tolentino, Joel Palencia, Jon Timmons, Tommy Peñaflor, Kim Last and Taki Saito. It premiered on October 24, 2016 on the network's afternoon line up replacing Calle Siete. The series concluded on September 22, 2017 with a total of 238 episodes. It was replaced by The Lolas' Beautiful Show in its timeslot.

Cast and characters

Lead cast
 Taki Saito as Martha Tanya Kiera "Taki" Masson-Mercado
 Kenneth Medrano as Kenneth "Ken" Garcia-Mercado
 Miggy Tolentino as Angelo Miguelito "Miggy" Tolentino
 Kim Last as Kim Michael Park
 Tommy Peñaflor as Tommy "Taba" Fernando
 Joel Palencia as Joel "Jo" Santos
 Jon Timmons as Jonathan "Jon" Masson

Supporting cast
 Toni Aquino as Joanna "Liempo" Santos
 Krystal Reyes as Zoey Sevilla
 Shaira Diaz as Amanda "Mandy" Santiago-Tolentino
 Benjie Paras as Fred Fernando
 Irma Adlawan as Sheena "Momskie" Tolentino
 Rey "PJ" Abellana as Armando Santiago
 Juan Rodrigo as Kevin Mercado
 Dexter Doria as Armida Santiago
 Ces Quesada as Aurora Agoncilio
 Leo Martinez as Eli
 Allysa de Real as Sandra
 Jace Flores as Mars
 Archie Adamos as Bien

Guest cast
 Ai-Ai Delas Alas as Rosa Mystica "Rose" Carpio Vda. de Roxas
 Ina Raymundo as Almalyn Macauba
 Glenda Garcia as Celia Garcia-Mercado 
 Maureen Mauricio as Rebecca Silangkuan
 Gilleth Sandico as Zita Sevilla
 Marco Alcaraz as Bastie
 Lou Veloso as Uge / Noy
 Ermie Concepcion as Ces
 Rolando Inocencio as Mr. Sarmiento
 Kate Lapuz as Pia Angelie Avela
 Francis Mata as Mr. Chua
 VJ Mendoza as a school pageant host
 Andrew Gan as Carlo
 Afi Africa as Mr. Kulote
 Rhett Romero as Zoey's father
 Myka Flores as Mariah
 Ryan Arana as Loren Jaime
 Therese Malvar as Veronica "Roni / Nica" Sanchez
 Kenken Nuyad as Renato "Nato" Monteza
 Yasser Marta as Drew
 Phytos Ramirez as Diego
 Jan Marini as Ces
 Jojo Alejar as Dindo Soterio
 Empress Schuck as Monette Soterio
 Super Tekla as Tiffany

Ratings
According to AGB Nielsen Philippines' Mega Manila household television ratings, the pilot episode of Trops earned a 15.5% rating. While the final episode scored a 4.1 rating in Nationwide Urban Television Audience Measurement People in television homes.

References

External links
 

2016 Philippine television series debuts
2017 Philippine television series endings
Filipino-language television shows
GMA Network drama series
Television series by TAPE Inc.
Television shows set in Manila
Television shows set in Quezon City